Boronia angustisepala is a plant in the citrus family Rutaceae and is endemic to New South Wales, Australia. It is an erect shrub with many branches, pinnate leaves with up to eleven leaflets, and bright pink, four-petalled flowers.

Description
The eight stamens alternate in length with those near the sepals longer than those near the petals.

Taxonomy and naming
Boronia angustisepala was first formally described in 1999 by Marco F. Duretto and the description was published in the journal Muelleria from a specimen collected in the Gibraltar Range National Park. The specific epithet (angustisepala) was derived from the Latin words  meaning "narrow" and  meaning "sepal", referring to the narrow sepals of this species.

Distribution and habitat
This boronia grows in forest on sandstone or granite and is found in the Gibraltar Range National Park and the Bylong-Sandy Hollow-Denman area.

References 

angustisepala
Flora of New South Wales
Plants described in 1999
Taxa named by Marco Duretto